The Honest Company, Inc. is an American digital-first consumer goods company, based in Los Angeles and founded by actress Jessica Alba. The company had $319 million in 2021 sales, and was valued at roughly $550 million as of February 2022. Chief Executive Officer Carla Vernón is the first Afro-Latina CEO of a U.S. publicly traded company. The Honest Company has raised multiple rounds of venture capital, and went public via initial public offering in May 2021, generating over $100 million in capital. Honest serves the United States, China, Canada, and Europe.

History

Company founder Jessica Alba was inspired by the 2008 birth of her first child and her own history of childhood illnesses to create a company that provided an alternative to baby products with ingredients such as petrochemicals and synthetic fragrances. Alba launched the company in 2012 with 17 products. 

In 2013, The Honest Company's sales reached $50 million. Honest raised $70 million from venture capitalists in the summer of 2014 in preparation for an initial public offering. As of August 2014, the company's products were available at retail stores in the United States and Canada.  The financing put a value on the company of $1 billion.  Prior to the 2014 round of financing led by Wellington Management Company, the company had raised $52 million in financing from ICONIQ Capital, General Catalyst Partners, Institutional Venture Partners and Lightspeed Venture Partners.

In November 2014, 80% of the company's $170 million in sales were online via a monthly subscription service with the remainder being done in department stores and discount warehouses.

In 2016, The Honest Company moved its headquarters from Santa Monica to the Playa Vista neighborhood of Los Angeles. The following month, it announced a new round of funding that generated an additional $100 million of venture capital, implying a valuation of $1.7 billion. In late 2015, the company acquired Alt12 Apps, the makers of popular apps such as Baby Bump, Pink Pad, and Kidfolio. 

In March 2017, The Honest Company announced that Nick Vlahos would replace Brian Lee as Chief Executive Officer. Vlahos worked on several Unilever brands, including Burt's Bees, Brita and Green Works. Brian Lee would remain on the board in an advisory role. 

In October 2017, The Honest Company closed a series E round of funding. After settling two lawsuits in the summer of 2017, the valuation was set at $19.60 per share down from the Series D shares sold in 2015 at $45.75, and market value of less than $1 billion.

In April 2021, The Honest Company officially filed for an initial public offering. The company began trading on the NASDAQ exchange with ticker symbol HNST on May 5, 2021.  The IPO raised $412.8 million.

Products and distribution
The Honest Company markets its products as safe and eco-friendly. The company does not use "health-compromising chemicals or compounds", including the "No List" of ingredients that it promises to never allow in its products. Whole Foods and Costco were The Honest Company's initial retail distributors. The company began selling in Target Corporation on June 15, 2014. Other stores that carried the company's products by mid 2014 included Buy Buy Baby and Nordstrom. By the end of the third quarter of 2014, the company carried 90 products. Its leading seller was diapers. 

Under Vlahos as CEO, Honest Company expanded its internal laboratories and R&D team and opened a fulfillment center. In 2022, Honest expanded and formed retail partnerships with Walmart, Ulta, and GNC. In the Ulta partnership, Honest released its first acne line.  In the fall of 2022, Honest Company partnered with SuperOrdinary to launch in China on the e-commerce platform, Tmall Global.

Critical reception 
In March 2016, it was reported by The Wall Street Journal that Honest's liquid laundry detergent product contained "a significant amount" of sodium lauryl sulfate or SLS, a synthetic surfactant that the company claimed it would "never consider for use in anything. Period." Honest's detergent is sourced from Earth Friendly Products (EFP) which did not test for SLS.  EFP in turn purchased untested chemicals from Trichromatic West which also did not test for SLS. EFP had removed its claims of SLS-free product from its own website in late 2015.

In April 2016, Good Morning America reported that The Honest Company was being sued for representing its infant formula as organic even though the product contained 11 synthetic substances prohibited under federal law in organic products. Honest Company stated that the infant formula had been FDA approved and certified USDA Organic in accordance with the National Organic Program. In December 2016, the Los Angeles Superior Court entered judgment for The Honest Company, dismissing the complaint.

Honest Beauty
On September 9, 2015, the company introduced the Honest Beauty brand as a separate entity with its own website and logo. Its products are derived from botanicals free of parabens, phthalates, petrolatum, sulfates and chemical sunscreens. On September 25 of that year, the brand opened a pop-up retail shop in The Grove.  The brand began selling the beauty line at Target in spring 2017.

Honest Beauty debuted in Western Europe (Germany, France, Spain, Italy, Poland, the Netherlands, and Austria) in 2019. Honest Beauty was sold exclusively by Douglas stores in Europe.

In 2021, Honest Beauty redesigned its brand packaging, using sustainable and recyclable materials. At the same time, it launched the Daily Defense skincare collection to protect from environmental pollutants. In 2022, Honest Beauty launched a four-step daily skincare routine for sensitive skin.

Notes

External links 
 

Charities based in California
Companies based in Los Angeles
American companies established in 2011
Retail companies established in 2011
Corporate social responsibility
Ethical consumerism
Jessica Alba
Online retailers of the United States
Subscription services
Companies listed on the Nasdaq
2021 initial public offerings